The 1973 CONCACAF Championship qualification consisted of a single round of play. The 14 teams were divided into 6 groups of 2 or 3 teams (four groups with 2 teams and two groups with 3 teams). The teams would play against each other on a home-and-away basis. The group winners would then advance to the tournament.

Results

Group 1

 

 

 

 

 

Mexico advance to the tournament.

Group 2

 

Guatemala advance to the tournament.

Group 3

 

Honduras advance to the tournament.

Group 4

Jamaica withdrew, so Netherlands Antilles advance to the tournament automatically.

Group 5

 

Haiti advance to the tournament.

Group 6

 

 

 

 

 

Trinidad and Tobago advance to the tournament.

Goalscorers

6 goals
 Emmanuel Sanon

5 goals
 Steve David

4 goals

 Arnold Robert Zebeda
 Sammy Llewellyn

3 goals

 Rigoberto Gómez
 Raymond Roberts
 Willy Roy

2 goals

 Patrick Morris
 Nelson Melgar
 Jean-Claude Désir
 Juan Manuel Borbolla
 Fernando Bustos
 Cesário Victorino
 Armand Doesburg
 Arnold Miller
 Edwin Schal
 Leopold Brewster
 Leroy Spann
 Gene Geimer

1 goal

 Vernon Edwards
 Jimmy Douglas
 Glen Johnson
 Ike MacKay
 Buzz Parsons
 Brian Robinson
 Bruce Twamley
 Nemesia Cárcamo
 Wálter Elizondo
 Asdrúbal Paniagua
 Roy Sáenz
 Claude Barthélemy
 Pierre Bayonne
 Guy François
 Philippe Vorbe
 Jorge Bran
 Jorge Urquía
 Enrique Borja
 Sergio Ceballos Aldape
 Eugene Sordam
 Rudy Getzinger

Sources
Match scores at FIFA.com

References

qualification
CONCACAF Gold Cup qualification
Qual